Starikovsky is a rural locality (a khutor) in Nizhneosinovskoye Rural Settlement, Surovikinsky District, Volgograd Oblast, Russia. The population was 44 as of 2010.

Geography 
Starikovsky is located 9 km northwest of Surovikino (the district's administrative centre) by road. Nizhneosinovsky is the nearest rural locality.

References 

Rural localities in Surovikinsky District